Camponotus eastwoodi is a species of ant in the genus Camponotus. Described by McArthur in 1996, the species is restricted to Queensland and New South Wales.

See also
List of ants of Australia
List of Camponotus species''

References

eastwoodi
Hymenoptera of Australia
Insects described in 1996